Acanthognathus lentus is a species of ant belonging to the genus Acanthognathus. Described in 1922 by Mann, the species is native to Central America and South America.

References

Myrmicinae
Hymenoptera of South America
Insects described in 1922